Castlemourn is a campaign setting for the Dungeons & Dragons role-playing game by Ed Greenwood, published by Margaret Weis Productions, Ltd. The world of Castlemourn lost its past during a cataclysm, and now various races (including old, such as elves and dwarves, and new ones) try to find their history.

Setting
Castlemourn is a land searching for its past. Its people are unaware of their origins, the greatness of their history, or what disaster brought about the Dark Age that has engulfed the land. Some three hundred years before the setting's current era, there existed a magical place of shining towers and marvelous wonders called the Realm of Castles. Legends tell of a great war against fell creatures that destroyed the realm, leaving scorched ruins and crumbling citadels. Whatever befell this realm was so terrible that the gods have "cordoned" it off. No one is permitted to leave Castlemourn and those who find their way there, do so at their own peril, as adventurers, treasure hunters, and questors scour the land searching for relics, artifacts, and clues to their past. Castlemourn is a post-apocalyptic fantasy setting where kingdoms fight for power through political intrigue and outright warfare; where the brave seek their fortunes in dangerous ruins, and where everyone fears the unspeakable evil that shadows their land.

Races
In Castlemourn, one can find almost all of the core races, except half-orc. However, their base abilities all changed in some ways.
Dwarves: Dwarves are a stout miner race, just like in the core settings. However, they perceive the world as an illusion, so they are more prone to be affected by illusions, but can ignore real dangers, as if they were only illusions.
Elves: Elves are lithe creatures of the woods, who glow with light, and therefore hardly can hide from others.
Half-Elves: Just like their elven ancestors, they glow, but with a dimmer light.
Halflings: Small people, who are the masters of forging magical items.
Gnomes: Gnomes are little humanoids, who swore to commit a great task in their lives.
Godaunts: Fell beasts, who are looked down by other races. They are the equivalent of the half-orc.
Thaele: Vampire-like mysterious race.

Classes
There is only one extra class beside the core classes of D&D: the buccaneer. The buccaneers are pirates, seafaring swashbucklers. There are six prestige classes as well: dusked, faithless one, rhymesword, servant of the Seven, truesword knight and waymaster.

Dungeons & Dragons campaign settings